İzmir gas power plant is a gas-fired power station in İzmir Province in western Turkey.

References

External links
 

Natural gas-fired power stations in Turkey
Buildings and structures in İzmir Province